Isaac David Kehimkar is an Indian naturalist, photographer, author and teacher. He is the author of the field guides The Book of Indian Butterflies, published by Bombay Natural History Society, and Butterflies of India.

In 2017, he joined iNaturewatch foundation.

References

Living people
Indian lepidopterists
Indian naturalists
Indian male writers
21st-century Indian writers
1957 births